Langsee is a lake in Angeln, Kreis Schleswig-Flensburg, Schleswig-Holstein, Germany. At an elevation of 16.35 m, its surface area is 151.38 ha.

Lakes of Schleswig-Holstein